Lasker may refer to:

Lasker (surname)
Lasker, North Carolina
Lasker Award, an award for medical research
Lasker's Manual of Chess, a book on the game of chess by Emanuel Lasker.
Lasker–Noether theorem or Lasker Ring, a mathematical theorem
NOAAS Reuben Lasker (R 228), an American fisheries and oceanographic research ship in commission in the National Oceanic and Atmospheric Administration fleet since 2014

See also 
 Lascar (disambiguation)
 Laskar (disambiguation)
 Laski (disambiguation)
 Łask, a town in Poland